Peter David Wright (born 15 August 1982) is an English professional footballer who played in the Football League, as a forward for Newcastle United and Halifax Town.

Career
Wright started his career in the youth system at Blackburn Rovers before transferring to Newcastle United. In 2000, he signed his first professional contract with the FA Premier League side, featuring predominantly in the reserves. In the summer of 2001, Wright joined Football League Third Division side Halifax Town on a free transfer. It was at Halifax where he made his professional debut in a 2–1 win over Lincoln City, replacing Craig Midgley as a substitute. He spent one season at The Shay making 17 appearances in all competitions. Halifax were relegated to the Football Conference and Wright then dropped into non-league with Northern Premier League side Burscough. He spent one season with Burscough captaining them to lift the 2003 FA Trophy Final, with victory over Tamworth at Villa Park. He transferred to fellow Northern Premier League side Southport for a short spell before being handed the opportunity to move to Conference National side Northwich Victoria in November 2003 for an undisclosed fee, reported to be £3,000. He scored four goals in 22 games as Northwich finished bottom of the table.

Wright signed for Conference North side Altrincham in June 2004 on a free transfer after his contract with Northwich expired. He started the season in the first team before fracturing his eye socket, which kept him out of action for a prolonged spell. In January 2005, Wright asked to leave the club after making 14 appearances scoring twice. He dropped back into the Northern Premier League joining Bamber Bridge, however, he could not save the club from relegation. In the summer of 2005 he joined Northern Premier League First Division side Chorley, finishing as the club's top goalscorer with 22 goals. In September 2006, Mossley manager Jason Beckford brought Wright to the Northern Premier League Premier Division side, where he made a total of 25 appearances scoring nine goals. In March 2007 he transferred to league rivals Kendal Town on a free transfer. Wright also had a brief spell playing for NPL Premier Division side Fleetwood Town under dual registration. In December 2007, Wright was banned from football by the Lancashire FA for two years after striking a referee whilst playing for Ribbleton Rangers in a five-a-side tournament staged in Preston, Lancashire. He returned to football in January 2010, re-signing for NPL First Division North side Bamber Bridge. In March 2010, he moved up a division and re-joined NPL Premier Division side Kendal Town. His stay at the club however was short and he quickly re-signed for Bamber Bridge. In the summer of 2011, he joined NPL Premier Division side Ashton United.

In November 2011, Wright joined Kendal Town for the third time in his career. In the summer of 2012, Wright joined NPL Premier Division side Leek Town on a free transfer. He scored 21 goals as the club finished in mid-table. In the summer of 2013, Wright was on the move again this time to NPL Premier Division rivals Nantwich Town. His spell at the club was short as Wright was on the move again in August 2013, signing for North West Counties Football League First Division side Nelson by manager Mark Fell. He linked up with Fell for the second time in his career having previously been coached by him at Chorley in 2006, when Fell was in Paul Lodge's coaching setup. Wright had a prolific goalscoring record in his first season at the club finishing as top scorer with 38 goals in 37 games in all competitions, as Nelson finished as champions gaining promotion to the North West Counties Football League Premier Division. This goal tally included an impressive five hat-tricks, with three of these coming in consecutive games in March 2014. In May 2014, Wright extended his stay with Nelson signing a one-year contract. In October 2015, he left Nelson after two years at the club and having scored 59 goals in 91 appearances.

Personal life
After finishing his professional career, Wright went on to work as a plumber full-time. He has three children with his former partner Rachel Livesey, Lewis, Jessica and Sophie. In January 2014, he helped to deliver his second child Jessica at their home in Lostock Hall, Lancashire. Less than 12 hours later he scored a last minute winner for Nelson in a 4–3 win over Daisy Hill.

Career statistics

Honours
Burscough
FA Trophy: 2002–03

Nelson
North West Counties Football League First Division: 2013–14

References

External links

1982 births
Footballers from Preston, Lancashire
Living people
English footballers
Association football forwards
Newcastle United F.C. players
Halifax Town A.F.C. players
Burscough F.C. players
Southport F.C. players
Northwich Victoria F.C. players
Altrincham F.C. players
Bamber Bridge F.C. players
Chorley F.C. players
Mossley A.F.C. players
Kendal Town F.C. players
Fleetwood Town F.C. players
Ashton United F.C. players
Leek Town F.C. players
Nantwich Town F.C. players
Nelson F.C. players
National League (English football) players
English Football League players
Northern Premier League players